Amarakaeri may refer to:
 Amarakaeri people, an ethnic group of Peru
 Amarakaeri language, a language of Peru